Chhan may refer to the following places:

India:
 Chhan, Bhopal, a village in Madhya Pradesh, India
 Chhan, Sawai Madhopur, a village in Rajasthan, India
Pakistan:
 Chhan, Khyber Pakhtunkhwa, an area of Abbottabad District, Khyber Pakhtunkhwa